The CIT Sorel-Varennes (CITSV), formally the Conseil Intermunicipal de Transport Sorel-Varennes, provides public transportation to the municipalities in the area northeast from Montreal along the right bank of the Saint Lawrence River in Quebec, Canada.  The communities served by CITSV stretch downstream along Quebec Highway 132, from Varennes through Saint-Amable, Verchères, Contrecoeur, Saint-Roch-de-Richelieu to Tracy, Saint-Joseph-de-Sorel and Sorel.

Services
Services consist of eight bus routes running to the Longueuil terminal of AMT, which is part of the Longueuil–Université-de-Sherbrooke Metro complex.

See also 
 Exo bus services

References

External links
 AMT site for CIT Sorel-Varennes
 Transit History of Montreal suburbs, Conseil Intermunicipal de Transport (CIT)

Transit agencies in Quebec
Transport in Sorel-Tracy
Bus transport in Quebec